Richar Luis Mercado Corozo (born December 20, 1986 in Esmeraldas, Ecuador) is an Ecuadorian professional footballer who plays as a forward.

Club career
Mercado started his professional career playing for U.T. de Cotopaxi in August 2004, playing in the Ecuadorian Segunda Categoría. After two years in this club, he took a big step in his career, signing with Ecuadorian giants El Nacional.

In January 2008, he signed a deal with Peruvian side FBC Melgar.

In mid 2011, Mercado signed a contract with Uruguayan side Montevideo Wanderers.

Later career
In December 2018, Mercado signed with Águila of the Salvadoran Primera División. He left the club in the summer 2019. 

In February 2020, it was reported that Mercado had joined Paraguayan club Sportivo Luqueño. However, in October 2020 Luqueño confirmed on Twitter, that Mercado never had signed officially with the club, but only trained with the team and played a few friendly games for them. This clarification came after Mercado was presented at Uruguayan club Rocha in October 2020, where Rocha, in a part of the welcome, mentioned Sportivo Luqueño as Mercado's last club. Mercado later sued Luqueño because he claimed, that he had signed a contract with the club and didn't receive the payment of the commitments contained in the contract.

Mercado officially joined Uruguayan club Rocha F.C. in the beginning of October 2020. In March 2021, Mercado joined Guayaquil SC.

Honours

Player

Club
C.D. Águila
 Primera División
 Champion: Clausura 2019

References

External links
 Profile at Ecuagol
 
 

1986 births
Living people
Sportspeople from Esmeraldas, Ecuador
Ecuadorian footballers
Ecuadorian expatriate footballers
Association football forwards
C.D. El Nacional footballers
FBC Melgar footballers
Manta F.C. footballers
Deportivo Azogues footballers
C.S.D. Independiente del Valle footballers
C.D. Técnico Universitario footballers
C.D. Quevedo footballers
Mushuc Runa S.C. footballers
Montevideo Wanderers F.C. players
C.D. Olmedo footballers
Universitario de Sucre footballers
C.S.D. Villa Española players
Atlético Pantoja players
L.D.U. Portoviejo footballers
C.D. Águila footballers
Rocha F.C. players
Liga Dominicana de Fútbol players
Ecuadorian expatriate sportspeople in Peru
Ecuadorian expatriate sportspeople in Uruguay
Ecuadorian expatriate sportspeople in Bolivia
Expatriate footballers in Peru
Expatriate footballers in Uruguay
Expatriate footballers in Bolivia
Expatriate footballers in the Dominican Republic